Lago d'Ampola is a lake at Tiarno di Sopra in Trentino, Italy. At an elevation of 730 m, its surface area is 0.5 km².

This lake and the surrounding wetland constitute a specific ecosystem hosting a peculiar flora and fauna. For that reason, the Autonomous Province of Trento declared this area as a protected biotope.

Notes 

Lakes of Trentino-Alto Adige/Südtirol